Ust-Kulomsky District (Kulömdïn rajon) is an administrative district (raion), one of the twelve in the Komi Republic, Russia. It is located in the south of the republic. Its administrative center is the rural locality (a selo) of Ust-Kulom. As of the 2010 Census, the total population of the district was 26,858, with the population of Ust-Kulom accounting for 19.1% of that number.

Administrative and municipal status
Within the framework of administrative divisions, Ust-Kulomsky District is one of the twelve in the Komi Republic. The district is divided into sixteen selo administrative territories and six settlement administrative territories, which comprise sixty-three rural localities. As a municipal division, the district is incorporated as Ust-Kulomsky Municipal District. Its twenty-two administrative territories are incorporated as twenty-two rural settlements within the municipal district. The selo of Ust-Kulom serves as the administrative center of both the administrative and municipal district.

References

Notes

Sources

Districts of the Komi Republic
